Abdullah bin Khalifa Al Thani (born 11 February 1958) was Prime Minister of Qatar from 29 October 1996 to 3 April 2007. He served as an advisor to the Emir and often represented him at ceremonial events and receptions.

Early years and education
Abdullah Al Thani is the eldest son of the former and 8th Emir of Qatar, Khalifa bin Hamad Al Thani, and his third wife, Sheikha Rudha bint Jassim bin Jabr Al Thani. He is the 3rd son of his father. Sheikh Abdullah is the younger half-brother of Hamad bin Khalifa Al Thani, the former Emir of Qatar.

Sheikh Abdullah received his school education in Qatar, earned his secondary school certificate in 1975, and graduated from the Royal Military Academy Sandhurst in December 1976.

Career
After graduation Sheikh Abdullah joined the armed forces of Qatar and held many senior military posts up to 1989 when he was appointed assistant commander-in-Chief of the armed forces, in the rank of lieutenant colonel. In 1979 Abdullah was appointed chairman of Qatar Olympic committee, and held this post until 1989.

On 17 July 1989, he was named minister of the interior. In addition to this post on 11 July 1995 he became deputy prime minister. On 29 October 1996, he was appointed prime minister and continued to assume his interior portfolio until 2 January 2001. On 3 April 2007, he resigned and was replaced by then foreign minister Hamad bin Jassem bin Jabr Al Thani as prime minister.

Personal life
Abdullah has six sons: Hamad, Suhaim, Tamim, Fahad, Mohammad and Khalifa. He speaks English and French fluently.

Abdullah owns several racehorses and as of 2012 he won EUR 2,070,043.78 prize money.

References

External links
 Qatar Ministry of Foreign Affairs

1958 births
Living people
Qatari Muslims
Prime Ministers of Qatar
Abdullah bin Khalifah Al Thani
Interior ministers of Qatar
Deputy Prime Minister of Qatar
Sons of monarchs